Buellia georgei is a species of lichen in the family Caliciaceae. Found in Australia, it was formally described as a new species in 2001 by lichenologists Ulrike Trinkaus, Helmut Mayrhofer, and John Elix. The type specimen was collected in Yanchep National Park (Western Australia); here it was found growing on soft limestone. It has also been recorded from South Australia, New South Wales, and the Australian Capital Territory; preferred habitats are calcareous outcrops, on thin soil over limestone, or rarely on calcareous soil. The lichen produces some secondary compounds: arthothelin as a major metabolite, and minor amounts of 4,5-dichloronorlichexanthone and thiophanic acid. The specific epithet honours Western Australian botanist Alex George.

See also
List of Buellia species

References

georgei
Lichen species
Lichens described in 2001
Lichens of Australia
Taxa named by Helmut Mayrhofer
Taxa named by John Alan Elix